Mt. Ennon Baptist Church is a Baptist megachurch located in Clinton, Maryland. It is affiliated with the [[[National Baptist Convention, USA]].

History
The church was founded in 1981 by Reverend Robert A. Samuels. 

Since 2004, Reverend Delman Coates became senior pastor. Under the leadership of Delman Coates, there is a church-wide initiative in the areas of spiritual, service, and substance growth. He is committed to a ministry of spiritual renewal, social justice, and community revitalization.

In 2009, Outreach magazine ranked Mt. Ennon as one of the 100 Fastest Growing Congregations in the United States.

In 2012, Coates announced his support for same-sex marriage. 

In 2013, the church had 8,000 members.

Programs 
As a church, Mt. Ennon also strives to impact the culture by becoming agents of social and civic change through furthering the cause of justice in the world today.  The church has engaged in media and healthcare reform advocacy.

References

External links 
 mtennon.org

Evangelical megachurches in the United States
Baptist churches in Maryland
Churches in Prince George's County, Maryland
Megachurches in Maryland
National Baptist Convention, USA churches